Frederick William III (3 August 1770 – 7 June 1840) was King of Prussia from 16 November 1797 until his death in 1840. He was concurrently Elector of Brandenburg in the Holy Roman Empire until 6 August 1806, when the Empire was dissolved.

Frederick William III ruled Prussia during the difficult times of the Napoleonic Wars. Following Napoleon's defeat, he took part in the Congress of Vienna, which assembled to settle the political questions arising from the new, post-Napoleonic order in Europe. His primary interests were internal – the reform of Prussia's Protestant churches. He was determined to unify the Protestant churches to homogenize their liturgy, organization, and architecture. The long-term goal was to have fully centralized royal control of all the Protestant churches in the Prussian Union of Churches. The king was said to be extremely shy and indecisive. His wife Queen Louise (1776–1810) was his most important political advisor. She led a mighty group that included Baron vom Stein, Prince von Hardenberg, Gerhard von Scharnhorst, and Count von Gneisenau. They set about reforming Prussia's administration, churches, finance, and military. He was the common ancestor of Tsar Nicholas II of Russia (through Princess Charlotte) and Kaiser Wilhelm II (through Wilhelm I). He was the dedicatee of Beethoven’s Ninth Symphony in 1824.

Early life

Frederick William was born in Potsdam on 3 August 1770 as the son of Frederick William II of Prussia and Frederica Louisa of Hesse-Darmstadt. He was considered to be a shy and reserved boy, which became noticeable in his particularly reticent conversations, distinguished by the lack of personal pronouns. This manner of speech subsequently came to be considered entirely appropriate for military officers. He was neglected by his father during his childhood and suffered from an inferiority complex his entire life.

As a child, Frederick William's father (under the influence of his mistress, Wilhelmine Enke, Countess of Lichtenau) had him handed over to tutors, as was quite normal for the period. He spent part of the time living at Paretz, the estate of the old soldier Count Hans von Blumenthal who was the governor of his brother Prince Heinrich. They thus grew up partly with the Count's son, who accompanied them on their Grand Tour in the 1780s. Frederick William was happy at Paretz, and for this reason, in 1795, he bought it from his boyhood friend and turned it into an important royal country retreat. He was a melancholy boy, but he grew up pious and honest. His tutors included the dramatist Johann Engel.

As a soldier, he received the usual training of a Prussian prince, obtained his lieutenancy in 1784, became a lieutenant colonel in 1786, a colonel in 1790, and took part in the campaigns against France of 1792–1794. On 24 December 1793, Frederick William married Louise of Mecklenburg-Strelitz, who bore him ten children. His wife Louise was particularly loved by the Prussian people, which boosted the popularity of the whole House of Hohenzollern, including the King himself.

Reign

Frederick William succeeded to the throne on 16 November 1797. He also became, in personal union, the sovereign prince of the Principality of Neuchâtel (1797–1806 and again 1813–1840). At once, the new King showed that he was earnest of his good intentions by cutting down the royal establishment's expenses, dismissing his father's ministers, and reforming the most oppressive abuses of the late reign. He had the Hohenzollern determination to retain personal power but not the Hohenzollern genius for using it. Too distrustful to delegate responsibility to his ministers, he greatly reduced the effectiveness of his reign since he was forced to assume the roles he did not delegate. This is the main factor of his inconsistent rule.

Disgusted with his father's court (in both political intrigues and sexual affairs), Frederick William's first and most successful early endeavor was to restore his dynasty's moral legitimacy. The eagerness to restore dignity to his family went so far that it nearly caused sculptor Johann Gottfried Schadow to cancel the expensive and lavish  project, which was commissioned by the previous monarch Frederick William II. He was quoted as saying the following, which demonstrated his sense of duty and peculiar manner of speech:

Every civil servant has a dual obligation: to the sovereign and the country. It can occur that the two are not compatible; then, the duty to the country is higher.

At first, Frederick William and his advisors attempted to pursue a neutrality policy in the Napoleonic Wars. Although they succeeded in keeping out of the Third Coalition in 1805, eventually, Frederick William was swayed by the queen's attitude, who led Prussia's pro-war party and entered into the war in October 1806. On 14 October 1806, at the Battle of Jena-Auerstädt, the French effectively decimated the Prussian army's effectiveness and functionality; led by Frederick William, the Prussian army collapsed entirely soon after. Napoleon occupied Berlin in late October. The royal family fled to Memel, East Prussia, where they fell on the mercy of Emperor Alexander I of Russia.

Alexander, too, suffered defeat at the hands of the French, and at Tilsit on the Niemen France made peace with Russia and Prussia. Napoleon dealt with Prussia very harshly, despite the pregnant queen's interview with the French Emperor, which was believed to soften the defeat. Instead, Napoleon took much less mercy on the Prussians than what was expected. Prussia lost many of its Polish territories and all territory west of the Elbe and had to finance a large indemnity and pay French troops to occupy key strong points within the Kingdom.

Although the ineffectual King himself seemed resigned to Prussia's fate, various reforming ministers, such as Heinrich Friedrich Karl vom und zum Stein, Prince Karl August von Hardenberg, Gerhard Johann David von Scharnhorst, and Count August von Gneisenau, set about reforming Prussia's administration and military, with the encouragement of Queen Louise (who died, greatly mourned, in 1810). After bereavement, Frederick William fell under the influence of a 'substitute family' of courtiers, among whom included Friedrich Ancillon, a Huguenot preacher that provided the king with strong ideological support against political reforms that might restrain monarchical power, Sophie Marie von Voß, an older woman with conservative views and Prince Wilhelm zu Sayn-Wittgenstein-Hohenstein.

In 1813, following Napoleon's defeat in Russia, Frederick William turned against France and signed an alliance with Russia at Kalisz. However, he had to flee Berlin, still under French occupation. Prussian troops played a crucial part in the victories of the allies in 1813 and 1814, and the King himself traveled with the main army of Karl Philipp Fürst zu Schwarzenberg, along with Alexander of Russia and Francis of Austria.

At the Congress of Vienna, Frederick William's ministers succeeded in securing significant territorial increases for Prussia. However, they failed to obtain the annexation of all of Saxony, as they had wished. Following the war, Frederick William turned towards political reaction, abandoning the promises he had made in 1813 to provide Prussia with a constitution.

Prussian Union of Churches

Frederick William was determined to unify the Protestant churches to homogenize their liturgy, organization, and architecture. The long-term goal was to have fully centralized royal control of all the Protestant churches in the Prussian Union of Churches. The merging of the Lutheran and Calvinist (Reformed) confessions to form the United Church of Prussia was highly controversial. Angry responses included a large and well-organized opposition. Especially the "Old Lutherans" in Silesia refused to abandon their liturgical traditions. The crown responded by attempting to silence protest.  The stubborn Lutheran minority was coerced by military force, their churches' confiscation, and their pastors' imprisonment or exile. By 1834 outward union was secured based on common worship but separate symbols—the opponents of the measure being forbidden to form communities of their own. Many left Prussia. The King's unsuccessful counterattack worsened tensions at the highest levels of government. The crown's aggressive efforts to restructure religion were unprecedented in Prussian history. In a series of proclamations over several years, the Church of the Prussian Union was formed, bringing together the majority group of Lutherans and the minority group of Reformed Protestants. The main effect was that the government of Prussia had full control over church affairs, with the king himself recognized as the leading bishop.

In 1824 Frederick William III remarried (morganatically) Countess Auguste von Harrach, Princess of Liegnitz.They had no children.

In 1838 the king distributed large parts of his farmland at Erdmannsdorf Estate to 422 Protestant refugees from the Austrian Zillertal, who built Tyrolean style farmhouses in the Silesian village.

Death 
Frederick William III died on 7 June 1840 in Berlin, from a fever, survived by his second wife. His eldest son, Frederick William IV, succeeded him. Frederick William III is buried at the Mausoleum in Schlosspark Charlottenburg, Berlin.

Issue

Honours

Ancestry

Siblings 
 Frederica Charlotte (1767–1820), who became Duchess of York by her marriage to Frederick, Duke of York
 Christine (1772–73)
 Louis Charles (1773–96)
 Frederica Louisa Wilhelmina (1774–1837), wife of William of Orange, afterward King William I of the Netherlands
 Augusta (1780–1841), wife of William II, Elector of Hesse
 Henry (1781–1846)
 William (1783–1851)

Works

Marches
 , 1806
 , circa 1820

References

Further reading 
 
 Clark, Christopher. Iron Kingdom: The Rise and Downfall of Prussia, 1600–1947 (2006) pp 298–320.
 Richardson, Constance. Memoirs of the Private Life and Opinions of Louisa, Queen of Prussia, Consort of Frederick William III (London, R. Bentley, 1847) online.
 Sheehan, James J. German History, 1770-1866 (1993) passim.
 Wright, Constance. Beautiful enemy: a biography of Queen Louise of Prussia (Dodd, Mead, 1969) online.

External links

 

|-

|-

|-

|-

1770 births
1840 deaths
19th-century German people
18th-century Kings of Prussia
19th-century Kings of Prussia
Kings of Prussia
Crown Princes of Prussia
Brandenburgian nobility
Prince-electors of Brandenburg
Princes of Neuchâtel
House of Hohenzollern
German landowners
People from Potsdam
Protestant monarchs
German Calvinist and Reformed Christians
Knights Cross of the Military Order of Maria Theresa
Knights of the Golden Fleece of Spain
3
3
3
Knights Grand Cross of the Military Order of William
Knights Grand Cross of the Order of the Sword
Extra Knights Companion of the Garter
Burials at the Charlottenburg Palace Park Mausoleum, Berlin